Jazmin Grace Grimaldi (born March 4, 1992) is an American actress and singer. She is the daughter of Prince Albert II of Monaco and Tamara Rotolo.

Prince Albert II publicly confirmed Grimaldi's paternity on June 1, 2006, claiming that he had wanted to protect her identity until she was an adult. Grimaldi is the older half-sister of Jacques, Hereditary Prince of Monaco and Princess Gabriella of Monaco. As Grimaldi's parents never married, she is not in the line of succession to the Monegasque throne. She is also the older half-sister of Alexandre Grimaldi-Coste.

Early life 
Grimaldi was born in Palm Springs, California, in the United States on March 4, 1992. Her mother, Tamara Jean Rotolo (born October 25, 1961, in California), later a real estate agent, was a waitress at the time she met Prince Albert of Monaco. Grimaldi was born when her mother's divorce proceedings to David Schumacher were not yet finalized. She did not meet her father until her visit to Monaco at the age of 11.

During her youth, she was active in her middle school's basketball team and often performed in church choirs and school plays. When she was young, her mother would often show her photographs of her grandmother, Grace Kelly. Her fondest memories involving her grandmother were watching High Society.

Grimaldi grew up in Palm Desert, California and Orange County. She was educated at St. Margaret's Episcopal School where she graduated in 2006 and a Catholic high school, JSerra High School, from where she graduated in June 2010. She was an honor student and a soloist in a school choir that performed with singer Barry Manilow. Upon graduation, she received the JSerra Senior Faculty Award and the Fine Arts Award. She was also selected to be a lifetime member of the California Scholarship Federation, and has been since she was a sophomore, entitling her to the distinction of Sealbearer.

After graduating from JSerra, she attended Fordham University where she studied theater and international business with an emphasis on humanitarian affairs. She graduated from  Fordham in May 2014. She attended Stella Adler Studio of Acting for two years.<ref
name="jgg"/> After graduating from university, she worked as a consultant at United Nations' World Food Programme for two years.<ref
name="jgg"/>

In February 2006, the French magazine Voici published photographs of Grimaldi and her mother during a visit to Monaco. The Prince has hired the security services of Gavin de Becker and Associates.

Activities and career 

On October 22, 2012, Grimaldi attended the 30th Anniversary of the Princess Grace Awards in New York City with her father and stepmother, Princess Charlene. In an article published in Hello magazine about the event, the Prince was described as protective of his daughter, who was said to admire and respect her father. Grimaldi's first published interview, in 2015 with Harpers Bazaar was conducted at the Prince's Palace of Monaco in Monte Carlo. Grimaldi talked about her grandmother Princess Grace, her father, her siblings and life in Monaco.

On March 14, 2018, she traveled to Monaco to celebrate her father's 60th birthday, days before final preparations for 28th Rallye Aicha des Gazelles du Maroc in Morocco, as did the daughter of Princess Stephanie, Pauline Ducruet. Grimaldi took 3rd Place in her class (e-class), for the all-women's event.

Grimaldi attend the 2019 Princess Grace Awards ceremony. In June 2020, during the COVID-19 pandemic, she tested positive for coronavirus, after showing mild symptoms for days. One month later, she announced on her Instagram that she had recovered from the virus.

Acting 
Grimaldi was cast in the third season of US web series The Marvelous Mrs. Maisel. Grimaldi also starred in several films such as Cicada, The Scarlet M and Millie's Big Day and cast in television dramas such as Jay and Pluto. She also starred in several theatre play such as The Glass Menagerie, Uncle Vanya and cast in Jake and Diane.

Music 
On December 4, 2019, Grimaldi released her debut single titled "Fearless". On December 19, 2019, she released her second single titled "Thankful", a collaboration with Ian Mellencamp.

Charity work 
In November 2006, Grimaldi visited eight islands in Fiji on a humanitarian mission to help bring the local children assistance in education, medicine, and community development. Grimaldi later founded an organization called The Jazmin Fund to help children in remote villages in Fiji.

Grimaldi said in an interview with Tory Daily that she was inspired to start The Jazmin Fund because "From an early age, I've been passionate about volunteering and getting involved in local outreach programs, and always wanted to start my own initiative." She said that her best experiences in Fiji was "dancing and singing with the kids of Fiji and seeing the excitement on their faces as we introduced their picture to them—through a camera—for the first time!" And she said that her proudest moment was being able to raise awareness and provide many items off of the villages' wish list.

Grimaldi is an advocate for women's empowerment and is part of American fashion designer Tory Burch's campaign Embrace Ambition, which is aimed at providing funds, education and resources to female entrepreneurs.

Succession issues
Out-of-wedlock children are not in the line of succession to the Monegasque throne according to Article 10 of the Constitution of Monaco, which specifies that only "direct and legitimate" descendants of Monaco's monarch or the monarch's siblings and their descendants may inherit the throne. Because her mother's divorce proceedings were not finalized by the time of Grimaldi's birth, Grimaldi could not have been legitimized for accession to the Monegasque throne through the subsequent marriage of her biological parents.

Prince Rainier III made obtaining succession rights in this manner impossible for the extramarital children of his son Albert by a 2002 modification to the constitution which limited the succession to direct, legitimate issue born in wedlock. On October 26, 2006, Albert II gave an interview to US television personality Larry King. Albert said his two eldest children are not in line for the Monegasque throne but that they would be taken care of financially. They also stand to inherit a part of Prince Albert's personal fortune, estimated at more than one billion dollars.

References

1992 births
Living people
American socialites
Gabelli School of Business alumni
Jazmin
Illegitimate children of Monegasque monarchs
Kelly family
People from Palm Springs, California
Catholics from California
Catholics from Pennsylvania
Actresses from California
Singers from California
American humanitarians
Women humanitarians
Fordham University alumni
Stella Adler Studio of Acting alumni
Daughters of monarchs
American people of Monegasque descent